Badhwana is a village in Dadri of Bhiwani district, Haryana, India.

References

Villages in Bhiwani district